Archdruid is the title used by the presiding official of the Gorsedd.
Although Iolo Morganwg was the first to preside over the Gorsedd when the National Eisteddfod came into being, his successor David Griffith, under the bardic name "Clwydfardd", was the first to be known by the official title "Archdruid".

The Archdruid's regalia, devised by the early revivers of the eisteddfod during the early 19th century, includes a crown, a sceptre, and a breastplate in the form of a torc. These were redesigned in 1896 by Hubert von Herkomer, to be made of gold and decorated with oak leaves, symbolising the sacred groves associated with druidry. (The Welsh word for "oak" is "derw" from which "druid" is thought to be derived.) A special ring of office was also introduced. The current sceptre has been in use since 1910, and a stola or cape was first worn in 1911 by the Archdruid "Dyfed".

Since 1932, only former winners of the Eisteddfod Crown or Chair have been qualified to become Archdruid. By the beginning of the twenty-first century Prose Medal winners were included in this elite band and the first to be elected under this ruling was Robyn Llŷn (Robyn Léwis) (2002–05). Christine James, who became Archdruid in 2013, is both the first woman and the first Welsh learner (i.e. a person not brought up with Welsh as his or her first language) to have held the title.

Since the Second World War, only one Archdruid has served more than one three-year term. Albert Evans-Jones ("Cynan"), a World War I veteran and a significant war poet, was elected in 1950 and again in 1963, and was regarded as a reforming influence on the festival; he publicly accepted that the eisteddfod and the gorsedd have no direct descent from  Welsh mythology or from the druids. He was knighted in 1969 for his services to Welsh culture, the only Archdruid to have been so honoured.

List of Archdruids of Wales
The following is a list of Archdruids.

Notes

References

 
Eisteddfod
Neo-druidism